Claude Joseph Antoine Provost (September 17, 1933 – April 17, 1984) was a Canadian professional ice hockey right winger.

Provost played his entire NHL career with the Montreal Canadiens. He won the Stanley Cup nine times and the first ever Bill Masterton Trophy awarded for perseverance in 1968.

He suffered a fatal heart attack while playing tennis at his home in Hallandale, Florida in 1984.

Provost won the most Stanley Cups of anyone who is not a member of Hockey Hall of Fame.  Every other player and executive who has won at least eight Stanley Cups has been named to the Hockey Hall of Fame. Provost also has the most NHL All-Star Game appearances of all eligible non-HHOF players.

Achievements
Stanley Cup champion — 1956, 1957, 1958, 1959, 1960, 1965, 1966, 1968, 1969 (with Montreal)
Won the Bill Masterton Trophy in 1968

Career statistics

See also

List of NHL players with 1000 games played

References

External links
 
 

1933 births
1984 deaths
Bill Masterton Memorial Trophy winners
Canadian ice hockey right wingers
French Quebecers
Ice hockey people from Montreal
Montreal Canadiens players
Montreal Junior Canadiens players
Shawinigan-Falls Cataracts (QSHL) players
Stanley Cup champions